Platygyna is a genus of plant of the family Euphorbiaceae, first described as a genus in 1830. It is native to Cuba and Haiti in the West Indies.

Species
 Platygyna dentata Alain - SE Cuba
 Platygyna hexandra (Jacq.) Müll.Arg. - Cuba, Haiti
 Platygyna leonis Alain - E Cuba
 Platygyna obovata Borhidi - E Cuba
 Platygyna parvifolia Alain - E Cuba
 Platygyna triandra Borhidi - E Cuba
 Platygyna volubilis Howard - E Cuba

References

Plukenetieae
Euphorbiaceae genera
Flora of the Caribbean